The Edinburgh Suburban and Southside Junction Railway was a railway company that built an east-west railway (known as the Edinburgh Suburban Line or more familiarly the Sub) on the southern margin of Edinburgh, Scotland, primarily to facilitate the operation of heavy goods and mineral traffic across the city. The line opened in 1884. Although its route was rural at the time, suburban development quickly caught up and passenger carryings on the line were buoyant; the passenger service operated on a circular basis through Edinburgh Waverley railway station.

Bus and tram competition hit the passenger service badly as the twentieth century progressed, and in 1962 the line closed to local passenger trains. It continues in use for freight traffic and diverted and excursion passenger trains.

There have frequently been proposals to reintroduce the local passenger service on the line, but  there is no active commitment to do so.

History

Railway traffic through Edinburgh
The Edinburgh and Glasgow Railway (E&GR) opened its main line in 1842 between Glasgow and the station at Edinburgh that became Haymarket station, at the western margin of the city. It showed that longer-distance railways could be successful, and encouraged the idea of connecting central Scotland with England; the North British Railway (NBR) opened its line from the station at North Bridge in Edinburgh to Berwick (later known as Berwick-upon-Tweed in 1846, and within a few weeks the E&GR opened an extension from Haymarket to its own station at North Bridge. There was a link for the transfer of wagons, but for the time being the two companies operated separate stations adjacent to one another.

Meanwhile, the Caledonian Railway was constructing its line from Edinburgh to Glasgow and Carlisle, running from Lothian Road station, and opening in 1847 - 1848. (The Caledonian later relocated to Princes Street station.)

The Caledonian line remained separate, and later a serious competitor, but the E&GR and the NBR were obviously complementary. The North Bridge station was extremely rudimentary at first and the two companies collaborated in improving it and making a shared station, and it was later renamed Waverley Station. Nonetheless the site was extremely cramped and for many years the accommodation was notoriously inadequate.

In 1865 the E&GR and the NBR amalgamated, keeping the name The North British Railway, and the opening of branch lines had led to substantially heavier traffic. The line through Waverley station was the only link between the lines east and west of Edinburgh. Mineral traffic increased considerably as the Lothian coalfield (south-east of Edinburgh) was developed, and much of the extracted mineral was consigned to the west of Scotland for shipment. All the goods and mineral traffic had to pass along the double track route from Portobello to Haymarket through Waverley station, finding a path between the increasingly frequent passenger services.

First proposals
The congestion was obviously serious, with no apparent solution on the route through Waverley. The line lay in a valley between very high ground on an east-west alignment, and any railway by-passing Waverley would have to be aligned south of the volcanic plug that forms Salisbury Crags and Arthur's Seat. In 1865 the NBR proposed a line from Haymarket to connect with the former Edinburgh and Dalkeith Railway near its terminus on the south side of the city. The Dalkeith line, now in NBR control, connected near Niddrie (often spelt Niddry at the time) with the NBR main line to Berwick and the Dalkeith route to the mineral fields. The Caledonian Railway too saw this as an opportunity to secure an advantage over its rival, and in the same year it too proposed a similar route from its own lines near Gorgie to Niddrie, intending to claim running powers over the NBR lines to get access to the Lothian coal fields. However neither of these schemes was progressed.

An Act for the ESS&SJR
Over the following years the congestion and the difficulty of working through Waverley station increased further, and the proposed construction of the Forth Bridge from 1871, promising much more traffic to the NBR at Edinburgh, intensified the perception that a resolution must be implemented. A Parliamentary Bill was prepared by the North British Railway, although the line was to be built by a nominally independent company.

The engineer Thomas Bouch was engaged to design a route from the complex of lines west of Haymarket to Portobello, and based on his work, an authorising Act of Parliament for the Edinburgh Suburban and Southside Junction Railway was given the Royal Assent on 26 August 1880. The capital was to be £22,500, and the NBR was to work the line for 50% of gross receipts.

The line was to be nearly seven miles (11 km) in length from a triangular junction near Haymarket to a triangular junction near Portobello. Portobello was being developed at this time as a marshalling location for goods and mineral traffic destined for points west of Edinburgh; for the time being this included traffic for the train ferry at Granton. The Caledonian objected to the Bill, and succeeded in getting three connecting spurs near Gorgie inserted into the Act, although these were never constructed.

However the Tay Bridge disaster of December 1879 fatally undermined confidence in Bouch's work, and the proprietors of the new Company decided to have the engineering design of the line reviewed, and this was done by George Trimble. A revised Bill was submitted to the 1882 session of Parliament and this gained the Royal Assent on 24 July 1882. Capital was £225,000. Instead of running independently to Portobello, the line was now to adopt the old Edinburgh and Dalkeith Railway route, and double the track, from near Duddingston to Niddrie, continuing to Portobello, and also provide additional spurs towards Dalkeith.

Although intended primarily for goods and mineral traffic, the topography of the route forced the inclusion of significant gradients, climbing at 1 in 88 westbound and 1 in 60 eastbound to Morningside. There was considered to be limited potential for local passenger traffic on the line; most of the route was remote and rural. It was hoped that the passenger traffic would build up over time.

Construction and opening
Construction of the suburban line, conducted primarily by contractors John Waddell and Sons, began in August 1881. There were initially difficulties in agreeing the scope of the works, as the Company included station and other works beyond the scope in which Waddell had tendered. Nonetheless the work proceeded satisfactorily, and it was anticipated that the line would be ready for the opening planned for the beginning of July 1884. However the roof of the tunnel under the Union Canal collapsed on 13 November 1883 causing alarm at first. The collapse turned out to be not as serious as at first thought, and the structure was stabilised by 20 December 1883.

The actual cost of the line was relatively low, although in 1882 the Merchant Company of Edinburgh (governors of George Watson's Hospital) presented the Company with a claim for £23,368.10/-, to cover the cost of the land upon which the suburban line was being built, as well as rectification works.

On 1 October 1884 the directors felt ready to request the Board of Trade inspection that was necessary for opening to passenger traffic, but as that could not be arranged immediately, the Company opened the line for goods and mineral traffic on 31 October 1884. An inspection train for the officers of the North British Railway traversed the line on 16 October 1884.

Major Marindin of the Board of Trade inspected the line on 15 November 1884 and approved the line for passenger operation, and it duly opened to passengers on 1 December 1884.

First operations

The heavy goods and mineral traffic was diverted to the line immediately. The passenger service was an hourly circular route from Waverley, referred to as the outer circle (clockwise) and the inner circle. Stations at first were provided at Duddingston, Newington, Blackford Hill, Morningside and Gorgie, and tickets were available in either direction, that is, intending passengers could catch the first train, whether inner or outer circle.

Station names were later changed and the route at Portobello varied. A basic additional platform was provided at Waverley to handle the trains, but it was not until a decade later that a more comprehensive facility was provided.

In accordance with the North British Railway's intention from the outset, the ES&SJR was absorbed by the NBR effectively from 1 May 1885, ratified by Act of Parliament of 22 July 1885.

Passenger service developments
The primary purpose of building the line had been the provision of a by-pass route for goods and mineral trains, but usage of the circle passenger service developed better than had been expected. Craiglockhart station on the suburban line was opened on 1 June 1887.

Suburban development was taking place elsewhere, and a curve was installed at Abbeyhill on the fork of the lines to Leith, opening on 1 October 1886. This enabled the suburban circle passenger trains to divert off the main line and make a station call at Abbeyhill from that date. A station was opened at Piershill on the Leith branch just off the main line, on 1 May 1891.

Craiglockhart station was closed temporarily from 1 May 1890 when a temporary station the other side of the Union Canal was opened in connection with the Edinburgh Exhibition of that year. Use of the original Craiglockhart station resumed on 1 January 1891.

Tramway competition
Edinburgh's first trams were horse-drawn; they began operation on 6 November 1871, and ran between Haymarket and Leith. The following year saw the establishment of the circle route, which ran via Marchmont and Church Hill to the West End of Princes Street; the fare was one penny, or two pence for a return. In 1881 and 1882 steam engine hauled trams were tried out at Portobello, but they were unsuccessful. From 1888 cable operated trams were introduced: they were hauled by a wire rope in a conduit under the road surface. By the turn of the twentieth century, Edinburgh's cable car system had increased to include 200 cars, servicing 25 route-miles of track.

Edinburgh's first electric trams ran experimentally between Ardmillan Terrace and Slateford in 1910. For some time the City Council enforced legal constraints on conversion of existing cable-worked sections to electric traction, but by 1923 the conversion was substantially complete. At the same time there was a considerable increase in bus services to outer suburban locations, and the convenience of tram and bus travel posed a massive challenge to passenger services on the Suburban Line.

Quadrupling west of Waverley
In 1895 the main line from Waverley station to Corstorphine Junction (later Saughton Junction, where the Queensferry line diverged) was quadrupled.

The twentieth century

On 1 July 1903 the Leith Central branch opened, serving large areas of northern suburbs. The Edinburgh Suburban Line trains were diverted to use Leith Central as their eastern terminus, connections being provided at Portobello for journeys from the eastern area of the Suburban Line to Waverley.

During World War I Craiglockhart and Blackford Hill stations were closed from January 1917.

At the end of the independent existence of the North British Railway, twelve passenger trains ran each way on the Suburban Line each weekday. The railways of Great Britain were grouped in 1923, following the Railways Act 1921 and the North British Railway was a constituent of the new London and North Eastern Railway (LNER).

In 1942 multiple aspect colour light signals were installed on the line, resulting in a saving in manpower.

The railways were nationalised in 1948, and the LNER lines locally became part of the Scottish Region of British Railways. A marked change in the routing of coal from the Lothian coalfields took place now: instead of running over the Edinburgh Suburban line it ran via Granton and Crewe Junction, a considerable detour.

In 1949 a report entitled the Civic Survey and Plan for Edinburgh was presented. As well as development of road and air links, the report proposed that a new line by-passing Waverley station should be built by extending from the St Leonards terminus of the original Edinburgh and Dalkeith line, doubling its approach railway, and tunnelling forward under the Meadows to emerge at a new two-level station at Morrison Street near Haymarket. Waverley was to be reduced to a "passing" station, handling only traffic local to the city. While many of the report's recommendations took effect, the railway proposals were too ambitious and nothing further was done.

In 1960 a spur was opened connecting the former Caledonian route at Slateford, with the Edinburgh Suburban line at Craiglockhart; this enabled trains from the Carstairs direction to run direct towards Niddrie and vice versa; previously such movements had still to run via Edinburgh Waverley. The spur cost £700,000.

Diesel multiple unit operation on the suburban line was introduced on 9 June 1958. However the costs of operating a passenger service considerably exceeded the income, and on 10 September 1962 the local passenger service was withdrawn.

The suburban line continued to be maintained to passenger standards as it was used for through services on diversion. Princes Street, the former Caledonian Railway Edinburgh terminus, was closed on Sundays from 20 May 1962 and the trains on that line reached Waverley by way of the Slateford spur and the suburban line.

In the early 1960s a major modernisation of the handling of wagonload freight took place, when Millerhill Marshalling Yard was constructed. Located on the east side of the city on the Waverley route; the Up Yard opened in June 1962, and the Down Yard in May 1963.

Gorgie East station was re-opened for one day on 21 May 1969 when a contingent of the Household Cavalry arrived by special trains, using the station.

Campaign for re-opening to passengers

Writing in 1991, Mullay said that from time to time schemes for re-opening the passenger service are urged in the media. The pace has not slackened since, with groups such as the Capital Rail Action Group and TRAC (a public transport subsidiary of Transform Scotland) being active currently. Neither of those groups had a proposal for passenger use of the Suburban Line on its website in 2015.

So far as Edinburgh's guided transportation systems are concerned, Edinburgh Trams has enjoyed the limelight for some years. First seriously planned in 2003, the emphasis was on connecting the airport and northern suburbs to the city centre although a branch route to Newcraighall was contemplated, and later dropped. None of the proposals involved running on the Suburban Line, although a tram-train solution has been advocated by a special interest group: this would have involved vehicles running on the Suburban Line and transferring to street running to achieve a more direct and convenient access to the city centre. This would have had the incidental advantage of avoiding adding to the train movements on the congested four-track section of the main line from Haymarket to Waverley, but would of course have constrained the route options on the South Side.

While future heavy rail passenger use of the Suburban Line cannot be ruled out, according to Mullay it may be a solution looking for a problem: the roundabout route from its stations to the city centre compared adversely to bus transits in 1991.

In 2016 managing director of ScotRail Alliance (alliance of Abellio ScotRail and Network Rail) said tram-trains could be introduced after the line electrification. In the city centre, tram-trains could turn into streets to avoid adding congestion at Waverley.

Present Day
, the lines are used mainly by freight trains as due to the busy nature and frequency of trains which run between Haymarket and Waverley, it is difficult to find a path to run trains in this area. All freight trains with the exception of a small handful use the mainline via Waverley before joining the Sub just after Newcraighall station.  there is currently one train per day which is booked to use the line: the 2105 from Glasgow Central to Edinburgh Waverley operated by CrossCountry which is booked to run on the line for train crew route knowledge retention. There are also a few Empty Coaching Stock (ECS) moves that use the line. The line is also used on occasions where the line between Haymarket and Waverley is closed for any engineering work, for example during the closure of Haymarket station in December 2019, when LNER and CrossCountry trains were diverted along the South Suburban line.

Topography

There was a triangular junction at Haymarket, with Haymarket West Junction facing Falkirk and Haymarket Central Junction facing Waverley. Both spurs climbed on sharp curves to join near Gorgie Road, the climbing at 1 in 80 through a deep cutting . After Craiglockhart station, another cutting was entered; this one required a pumping station to prevent flooding. The cuttings now became shallower as far as the summit near Morningside (Road) station, a hundred feet above the level of Haymarket. Now the line fell at 1 in 85 through a series of curves, then steepening to 1 in 75 as far as Newington. Next there was a long curved embankment past Cameron Toll, and immediately east of Duddingston station the line converged with the St Leonards line of the former Edinburgh and Dalkeith Railway. From there the earlier line continued to Niddrie West Junction, Niddrie North Junction, and Portobello, now facing Waverley.

Locations on the line were:

 Haymarket West Junction (west-facing) and Haymarket Central Junction (east facing);
 Gorgie Junction;
 Gorgie; opened 1 December 1884; renamed Gorgie East May 1952; closed 10 September 1962;
 Craiglockhart; opened 1 June 1887; closed 1 May 1890; reopened 1 January 1891; closed 1 January 1917; reopened 1 February 1919; closed 10 September 1962;
 Morningside; opened 1 December 1884; renamed Morningside Road 1886; closed 10 September 1962;
 Blackford Hill; opened 1 December 1884; closed 1 January 1917; reopened 1 February 1919; closed 10 September 1962;
 Newington; opened 1 December 1884; closed 10 September 1962;
 Duddingston and Craigmillar; opened 1 December 1884; closed 10 September 1962;
 Duddingston Junction; line from St Leonards converged;
 Niddrie West Junction; convergence with NBR spurs to main line and Dalkeith line.

See also
 Transport in Edinburgh

Notes

References

Railway lines in Scotland
Pre-grouping British railway companies
Closed railway lines in Scotland
Early Scottish railway companies
North British Railway
Railway companies established in 1880
Railway lines opened in 1884
Railway companies disestablished in 1885
Transport in Edinburgh
Standard gauge railways in Scotland
1880 establishments in Scotland
British companies established in 1880
British companies disestablished in 1885